The 31st Moscow International Film Festival was held from 19 to 28 June 2009. The Golden George was awarded to the Russian film Pete on the Way to Heaven directed by Nikolai Dostal.

Jury
 Pavel Lungin (Russia – President of the Jury)
 Shyam Benegal (India)
 Nick Powell (United Kingdom)
 Sergey Trimbach (Ukraine)
 Gulnara Dusmatova (Kazakhastan)

Films in competition
The following films were selected for the main competition:

References

External links
Moscow International Film Festival: 2009 at Internet Movie Database

2009
2009 film festivals
2009 festivals in Europe
Mos
2009 in Moscow
June 2009 events in Russia